Visbek (Old Saxon Fiscbechi) is a municipality in the district of Vechta, in the Oldenburg Münsterland region of the state of Lower Saxony, Germany.

Location and municipal subdivisions 

Visbek lies on the North German Plain, approximately 12 km to the north of Vechta. The municipality consists of the village of Visbek itself, together with 13 surrounding hamlets, viz. Astrup, Bonrechtern, Endel, Erlte, Hagstedt, Halter/ Meyerhöfen, Hogenbögen, Norddöllen, Rechterfeld, Varnhorn/ Siedenbögen and Wöstendöllen.

Neighbouring municipalities 

Neighbouring communities are (counting clockwise from north): the municipality of Großenkneten, including Ahlhorn, the town of Wildeshausen, the municipality of Goldenstedt, the town of Vechta and the municipality of Emstek.

Landscape 

Visbek is the northernmost municipality in Vechta district, bordering the rural districts of Cloppenburg and Oldenburg. To the west, north and east of the village of Visbek, lies the long, narrow strip of the nature reserve of Streams of the Endel and Holzhausen Heath, with the geest brooks and wet lowlands of the Aue, Twillbäke and Visbeker Bruchbach streams with their associated watermills.

Middle Ages 

Historical tradition dates back as far as to the late 8th century, when upon order of the Frankish king Charlemagne (later Emperor Charles the Great), the abbey of Visbek - then called "cellula fiscbechi", under Abbot Gerbert Castus - played a major role in the Christianization of the newly conquered surrounding Saxon territories of Lerigau, Hasegau and Venkigau.

In 855 AD, King Louis the German allocated the Benedictine Abbey of Visbek in the shire of Lerigau, with its territories and possessions, to the Imperial Abbey of Corvey.

Megalithic tombs 

The Visbek region, however, had been populated even before the Middle Ages, in fact as far back as the Neolithic Period, as evinced by numerous megalithic tombs of the Funnelbeaker culture (3,500 - 2,800 BC) that may still be seen today. Examples - aside from the Heidenopfertisch illustrated below - include the large stone graves of Mühlensteine, Schmeersteine, Visbeker Braut and Visbeker Bräutigam.

Media 

The following regional newspapers are delivered in Visbek:
 Oldenburgische Volkszeitung, Vechta
 Nordwest-Zeitung, Oldenburg

Economy 
Several companies of the meat industry are located in Visbek. The PHW Group, the largest German poultry meat producer, has its headquarters in Rechterfeld. The EW Group, the world market leader in poultry breeding and genetics, also has its headquarters in Visbek. Additionally, the Plukon Food Group runs poultry meat processing facilities in Visbek.

Regular festivities 
 Every year at Pentecost, the Visbek Shooting Club, St. Hubertus, hosts its Schützenfest fun fair and folk processions.
 The annual Visbek Rockt open air music festival takes place at the end of May, featuring local and regional rock bands.

Partner municipality 

 A partnership with Pontvallain in the Sarthe Departement has been maintained since 1988.

Gallery

References

External links 

 Official website of Municipality of Visbek
 Official website of the Catholic Parish Church of St. Vitus Visbek
 Official website of Visbek Rockt

Vechta (district)